Matías Daniel Campos Toro (born 22 June 1989), known as Matías Campos Toro, is a Chilean former footballer who plays as left midfielder or left back.

International career
Along with Chile U18 he won the 2008 João Havelange Tournament, scoring in the last game. At senior level, he made six appearances and scored a goal.

International goals

Personal life
He is usually named by his two last names, Campos Toro, to make a difference with his namesake Matías Campos López. Both players were with Audax Italiano in his early career and played for Universidad de Chile.

Honours

International
Chile U18
 João Havelange Tournament (1): 2008

References

External links
 Matías Campos at Football-Lineups
 
 

Living people
1989 births
Footballers from Santiago
Association football midfielders
Association football fullbacks
Chilean footballers
Chilean expatriate footballers
Chile international footballers
Chile youth international footballers
Chilean Primera División players
Serie A players
La Liga players
Segunda División players
Argentine Primera División players
Primera B de Chile players
Audax Italiano footballers
Udinese Calcio players
Club Deportivo Universidad Católica footballers
A.C.N. Siena 1904 players
Hércules CF players
Granada CF footballers
Unión Española footballers
Arsenal de Sarandí footballers
Universidad de Chile footballers
Santiago Wanderers footballers
Expatriate footballers in Italy
Chilean expatriate sportspeople in Italy
Expatriate footballers in Spain
Chilean expatriate sportspeople in Spain
Expatriate footballers in Argentina
Chilean expatriate sportspeople in Argentina